Oidaematophorus pseudotrachyphloeus is a moth of the family Pterophoridae. It is found in Argentina, Ecuador and Peru.

The wingspan is 22 mm. The forewings are ferruginous grey-brown and the markings are black-brown. The hindwings and fringes are brown-grey. Adults are on wing in April and May, and again from September to November.

Etymology
The name reflects the resemblance to Oidaematophorus trachyphloeus, and the confusion which may arise on superficial and external examination.

References

Moths described in 2011
Oidaematophorini
Moths of South America